Plum Creek is a tributary of the Allegheny River located in Allegheny County in the U.S. state of Pennsylvania. The stream was named for the plum trees lining its banks.

Course

Plum Creek rises within the grounds of Boyce Park in Plum, Pennsylvania; it flows west forming part of the boundary with Penn Hills. The stream joins the Allegheny River in both Oakmont and Verona boroughs.

Tributaries
(Mouth at the Allegheny River)

Bodies Run 
Little Plum Creek

See also

 List of rivers of Pennsylvania
 List of tributaries of the Allegheny River

References

External links

U.S. Geological Survey: PA stream gaging stations

Rivers of Pennsylvania
Tributaries of the Allegheny River
Rivers of Allegheny County, Pennsylvania